Dactyloctenium hackelii is a species of grass in the family Poaceae. It is found only in Yemen. Its natural habitat is subtropical or tropical dry lowland grassland.

References

hackelii
Endemic flora of Socotra
Data deficient plants
Taxonomy articles created by Polbot